Tiger Army is the first full-length release by California psychobilly band Tiger Army, released on October 26, 1999. The band had previously recorded a vinyl EP (the Temptation EP) in 1996, and came to the attention of Tim Armstrong, the owner of Hellcat Records. Armstrong contacted Tiger Army's lead singer, Nick 13, interested in the band recording an album. Although Nick 13 did not initially have a confirmed line-up for the band, the studio line-up consisted of Nick 13, drummer Adam Carson (borrowed from AFI) and bassist Rob Peltier, from The Quakes.

The album cover is based on a poster for the 1932 Frank Buck B-movie Bring 'Em Back Alive.

Guest appearances
Davey Havok of AFI and Tim Armstrong of Rancid are noted as contributing backing vocals on a number of songs.

Track listing

All songs written and composed by Nick 13, except where noted.

 "Prelude: Nightfall" – 1:52
 "Nocturnal" – 2:34
 "Fog Surrounds" – 2:39
 "True Romance" – 2:18
 "Devil Girl" – 1:51
 "Never Die" – 3:00
 "Moonlite Dreams" – 2:46
 "Trance" – 2:42
 "Twenty Flight Rock" – 1:34 (Eddie Cochran Cover)
 "Werecat" – 2:06
 "Outlaw Heart" – 3:59
 "Neobamboom" – 1:55
 "Last Night" – 3:22

References

Tiger Army albums
1999 debut albums
Hellcat Records albums